James Andrew Husband (born 3 January 1994) is an English professional footballer who plays as a left-back or a centre-back for EFL Championship club Blackpool. He has previously played for Doncaster Rovers, Middlesbrough, Fulham, Huddersfield Town, Norwich City and Fleetwood Town.

Career

Doncaster Rovers
Husband was born in Leeds, West Yorkshire. He attended Wigton Moor Primary School and Boston Spa School. After coming through the Leeds United academy, he moved to Doncaster Rovers and signed a two-year scholarship in the summer of 2010. He signed his first professional contract in November 2011, on a -year deal after reported interest from Premier League clubs. He made his first-team debut on 17 April 2012 in a goalless draw with Middlesbrough, coming on as a second-half substitute for Shelton Martis. He made his first start four days later, as Doncaster beat Coventry City 2–0. Husband was named man of the match in Rovers' League Cup round two win over Hull City.

Husband's first goals for Rovers came when he was temporarily moved to play in left midfield. The first was at Crawley Town on 18 February, followed by a second, eight days later, at Shrewsbury Town. At the end of the season, Rovers were promoted to the Championship.

Husband scored his first goal of the 2013–14 season on 16 August, when his overhit cross went over the head of Blackburn Rovers's goalkeeper to complete a 2–0 victory. Doncaster were relegated back to League One at the end of the season.

Middlesbrough
On 26 July 2014 it was announced that James Husband would join Championship side Middlesbrough in a swap deal for Curtis Main. Husband scored his first goal for the U21s in a 2–1 victory over Newcastle United's U21s in December 2014.

On 25 March 2015, Husband joined Fulham on loan until the end of the season as part of a deal that saw Fernando Amorebieta move the other way, also on loan. He re-joined Fulham, again on loan, for a month the following season in a similar deal to the previous one, with Amorebieta joining Middlesbrough on loan for the duration of the 2015–16 season.

Husband joined Huddersfield Town on an emergency loan on 8 January 2016. He made his début as a substitute in the 2–2 draw against Reading in the FA Cup third-round match at the John Smith's Stadium the following day. He made his league début the following week in the 1–1 draw against Fulham. He played twelve games for the Terriers before his spell ended on 9 April 2016.

Norwich City
On 11 July 2017, Husband joined Norwich City, on a three-year deal, for an undisclosed fee. He made his debut in the opening game of the season on 5 August, a 1–1 draw against Fulham. He was a regular for Norwich in the first half of the season, playing in fifteen league games and three EFL Cup games. However, after a 0–0 draw against next-to-bottom Burton Albion in December, Husband was dropped from the side, with Jamal Lewis replacing him as Norwich's first-choice left-back. Husband made three appearances in the second half of the season. The last of these was a 1–1 draw against Sunderland, where he was replaced by Lewis at half-time with the score 0-0.

At the beginning of the 2018–19 season, with Lewis injured, Husband returned to the side for the opening game, a 2–2 draw with Birmingham City; however, he was immediately dropped again, with the normally right-sided Ivo Pinto being played at left-back for the next game until Lewis could resume his place. This was Husband's only Norwich appearance of the season.

On 20 August 2018, Husband joined League One side Fleetwood Town on loan until January.

Blackpool
On 26 July 2019, Husband joined League One side Blackpool on a season-long loan deal. He was given a straight red card in his second appearance for the Tangerines, in a 3–1 win at Southend United. The loan deal was made permanent on 25 January 2020, Husband signing an 18-month contract with an option for a further 12 months.

Career statistics

Club

Honours
Doncaster Rovers
Football League One: 2012–13

References

External links

1994 births
Living people
Footballers from Leeds
English footballers
Association football defenders
Doncaster Rovers F.C. players
Middlesbrough F.C. players
Fulham F.C. players
Huddersfield Town A.F.C. players
English Football League players
Norwich City F.C. players
Fleetwood Town F.C. players
Blackpool F.C. players
Premier League players
People educated at Boston Spa Academy